Dahiyat Sabah al-Kheir is a Palestinian village in the Jenin Governorate in the northern West Bank, located 4 kilometers north of Jenin. According to the Palestinian Central Bureau of Statistics, the town had a population of 1,457 inhabitants in mid-year 2006.

In the wake of the 1948 Arab–Israeli War, and after the 1949 Armistice Agreements, Dahiyat Sabah al-Kheir came under  Jordanian rule.

Since the Six-Day War in 1967, Dahiya Sabah al-Kheir has been under Israeli occupation.

References

External links 
Survey of Western Palestine, Map 8: IAA, Wikimedia commons

Jenin Governorate
Villages in the West Bank
Municipalities of the State of Palestine